This is a partial list of notable islands of the United States, including its insular areas, which are listed at the end.

Alabama

Alaska

Arizona

Arkansas

California

Colorado
 Sentinel Island, Lake Dillon
 Silver Dollar Island, Lake Dillon
 Fishhook Island, Lake Dillon
 The Island, Cheesman Reservoir
 Elephant Island, Lake Granby
 Rainbow Island, Lake Granby
 Deer Island, Lake Granby
 Gull Island, Lake Granby
 Shelter Island, Lake Granby
 Harvey Island, Lake Granby
 Fish Island, Lake Granby
 Piedra Island, Lake Granby
 Hadfield Island, South Platte River
 Bridge Island, Steamboat Lake
 Watson Island, Colorado River

Connecticut

Delaware

Florida

Georgia

Several Sea Islands, including

 Cockspur Island
 Cumberland Island
 Jekyll Island
 Little Tybee Island
 Sapelo Island
 St. Catherines Island
 St. Simons Island
 Tybee Island
 Wassaw Island
 Ossabaw Island
 Egg Island
 Wolf Island
 Butler Island
 Blackbeard Island

Hawaii

Idaho
 Rock Island

Illinois

Indiana

Iowa

Kansas

Kentucky
 Big Bone Island, Ohio River
 Corn Island, Ohio River (submerged underwater)
 Diamond Island, Ohio River
 Sixmile Island, Ohio River near downtown Louisville

Louisiana

 Avery Island
 Avoca Island

 Chandeleur Islands
 Cote Blanche

 Grand Isle
 Last Island
 Marsh Island

Maine

Maryland

Massachusetts

Michigan

Minnesota

 Baldwin Island
 Barrett Island
 Bear Island
 Campers Island
 Crane Island
 Deering Island, Lake Minnetonka

 Grey Cloud Island
 Latsch Island
 Nicollet Island
 Oak Island
 Pike Island
 Spirit Island, Lake Minnetonka
 Star Island, the island containing Lake Windigo

Mississippi

 Cat Island
 Davis Island
 Deer Island

 Horn Island
 Petit Bois Island
 Ship Island

Missouri

 Grand Tower Island
 Howell Island
 Nodaway Island
 Tower Rock

Montana

Nebraska
 Goat Island

Nevada
 Anaho Island
 Cottonwood Island
 Overton Islands

New Hampshire

New Jersey

New Mexico

New York

North Carolina

 Bald Head Island
 Bear Island
 Bogue Banks
 Bunch of Hair
 Cedar Island
 Core Banks
 Figure Eight Island
 Gaylords Island
 Harkers Island
 Hatteras Island

 Ocean Isle
 Ocracoke Island
 Oak Island
 Pleasure Island
 Pea Island
 Bodie Island
 Roanoke Island
 Topsail Island

 Masonboro Island
 Shackleford Banks
 Sunset Beach Isle
 Holden Beach
 Bird Island (lies on the coastal border with South Carolina)
 Knotts Island
 Wrightsville Beach

North Dakota

 Grahams Island
 Gros Ventres Island – historical

Ohio

 Kelleys Island
 Bass Islands

Oklahoma
 Monkey Island

Oregon

 Carpenters Island
 Coon Island
 Eighteenmile Island
 Goat Island
 Government Island
 Hayden Island

 McGuire Island
 Oregon Islands National Wildlife Refuge
 Ross Island
 Sauvie Island
 Tenasillahe Island
 Wizard Island

Pennsylvania

Rhode Island

South Carolina

 Capers Island
 Cedar Island
 Daufuskie Island
 Deveaux Bank
 Edisto Island
 Folly Island
 Fripp Island
 Goat Island
 Goat Island (Lake Wylie)

 Harbor Island
 Hilton Head Island
 Hunting Island
 Isle of Palms
 James Island
 Johns Island
 Kiawah Island
 Morris Island

 Parris Island
 Pawleys Island
 Pine Island
 Saint Helena Island
 Seabrook Island
 Sullivan's Island
 Wadmalaw Island
 Waties Island

South Dakota
 Goat Island

Tennessee
 Geiger Island

Texas

Utah
 Antelope Island
 Gunnison Island
 Stansbury Island
 Fremont Island

Vermont

Virginia

 Assateague Island
 Brown's Island

 Chincoteague Island
 Tangier Island

Washington

Washington, D.C.

West Virginia

Wisconsin

Wyoming

Insular areas

Inhabited

American Samoa

 Swains Island
 Ofu Island
 Ta‘ū Island
 Rose Atoll

 Pola Island
 Olosega Island

 Aunu‘u Island
 Tutuila Island

Guam
 Agrigan
 As-Gadao
 Cabras Island
 Cocos Island
 Fofos
 Guam

Northern Mariana Islands

 Rota
 Saipan
 Tinian
 Farallon de Pajaros

 Maug Islands
 Pagan Island
 Guguan
 Agrihan Island

 Sarigan Island
 Anatahan Island
 Asuncion Island
 Farallon de Medinilla

 Aguigan Island
 Alamagan Island
 Mañagaha Island
 Zealandia Bank

Puerto Rico

U.S. Virgin Islands

U.S. Minor Outlying Islands (uninhabited)

 Baker Island
 Howland Island
 Jarvis Island
 Johnston Atoll
Akau (North) Island
Hikina (East) Island
Johnston Island
Sand Island
 Kingman Reef
 Midway Atoll
Eastern Island
Sand Island
Spit Island
 Navassa Island
 Palmyra Atoll
 Aviation Island
 Bird Island
 Bunker Island
 Cooper–Meng Island
 Eastern Island
 Engineer Island
 Holei Island
 Home Islets
 Kaula Island
 Marine Island
 Papala Island
 Paradise Island
 Pelican Island
 Quail Island
 Sand Island
 Strawn Island
 Tanager Island
 Whippoorwill Island
 Wake Island
Peale Island
Wake Island
Wikes Island

Disputed
 Serranilla Bank
 Bajo Nuevo Bank
 Machias Seal Island

See also
 Lists of islands
 List of islands of the Great Lakes
 Thousand Islands
 List of islands on the Potomac River
 List of islands of the United States by area

External links
 The Master List of U.S. Islands including islands in rivers and very small islands not included on this list.

 
United States

es:Anexo:Islas de los Estados Unidos
fr:Liste des îles des États-Unis
pl:Wyspy Stanów Zjednoczonych
pt:Anexo:Lista de ilhas dos Estados Unidos
sv:Lista över öar i USA